The 1914 Nobel Prize in Literature was not awarded when the committee's deliberations were upset by the beginning of World War I (1914–1918). Thus, the prize money was allocated to the Special Fund of this prize section. This was the first occasion in Nobel history that the prize was not conferred.

Nominations
Despite no author(s) being awarded for the 1914 prize, numerous literary critics, societies and academics still sent nominations to the Nobel Committee of the Swedish Academy. In total, the academy received 26 nominations for 24 individuals.

Seven of the nominees were nominated first-time including Willem Kloos, Dmitry Merezhkovsky, Vilhelm Grønbech, René Bazin, and Josef Svatopluk Machar. The highest number of nominations – two nominations each – were for Harald Høffding, Ángel Guimerá Jorge, and Carl Spitteler (awarded in 1919). Two Italian female writers were nominated Dora Melegari and Grazia Deledda (awarded in 1926).

The authors Delmira Agustini, Dimitrie Anghel, Jakub Arbes, Robert Hugh Benson, Robert Jones Burdette, Nikolai Chayev, Mariana Cox Méndez, Alessandro d'Ancona, Danske Dandridge, Mircea Demetriade, Augusto dos Anjos, Edith Maude Eaton, Henri-Alban Fournier (known as Alain-Fournier), Jules Lemaître, Theodor Lipps, Isabella Fyvie Mayo, Christian Morgenstern, Charles Sanders Peirce, Charles Péguy, Bhaktivinoda Thakur, Brandon Thomas, Georg Trakl, Bertha von Suttner (who won the 1905 Nobel Peace Prize), Theodore Watts-Dunton, and Peyo Yavorov died in 1914 without having been nominated for the prize.

References

1914
Cultural history of World War I